The Wingra Park Historic District is located in Madison, Wisconsin, United States. It was added to the National Register of Historic Places in 1999.

History
The land that the district now sits on was purchased by William T. Fish in 1889. Most of the contributing buildings in the district were constructed from 1891 to 1940.

References

Geography of Madison, Wisconsin
Houses on the National Register of Historic Places in Wisconsin
Houses in Madison, Wisconsin
Historic districts on the National Register of Historic Places in Wisconsin
National Register of Historic Places in Madison, Wisconsin